Bug Fables: The Everlasting Sapling is a role-playing video game developed by Panamanian independent studio Moonsprout Games and published by Dangen Entertainment. It was released on November 21, 2019, for Microsoft Windows, on May 28, 2020, for Nintendo Switch, PlayStation 4, and Xbox One, and on July 1, 2021, for Amazon Luna. Taking inspiration in art and gameplay from the first two Paper Mario games, the game's plot centers around three bugs (Vi, Kabbu, and Leif) as they search the mythical land of Bugaria in pursuit of the Everlasting Sapling, an item capable of eternal life. Along the way, they meet rival teams, past traumas, and other roadblocks hunting for the titular sapling. Bug Fables received positive reviews from critics, who praised its characters, combat system, presentation, and amount of content, but criticized its control issues.

Gameplay
The gameplay of Bug Fables is heavily inspired by that of Paper Mario and its sequel, The Thousand-Year Door. The player controls three characters: Vi the bee, who uses her boomerang for multi-hit attacks, Kabbu the beetle, who uses his horn for single-hit attacks, and Leif the moth, who uses ice magic to freeze enemies. When exploring the overworld, these characters can use their unique abilities to traverse the environment, solve puzzles, and find secrets, and as the game progresses, more abilities are unlocked. Enemies are visible on the overworld and can be either engaged or avoided. Combat is played in a turn-based format which makes use of small minigames similar to Paper Mario, as the player must time button presses to maximize the efficacy of their moves, or to take less damage from enemy attacks. The party also shares Teamwork Points (TP), which are used for special attacks, as well as Medal Points (MP), which are used for equipable medals that can enhance certain attributes, grant resistance to status debuffs, or unlock special moves. Upon winning a battle, the party is awarded Exploration Points (EXP); earning enough EXP will increase the party's explorer rank, where the player can choose to increase their HP by 1 per member, or TP or MP by 3. At certain ranks, the party will learn new moves or gain boosts to their stats, or inventory space.

Synopsis
Setting

Bug Fables takes place in the land of Bugaria, which is revealed to be entirely within the backyard of an abandoned house. The land is populated by intelligent insects, who gained sapience following the extinction of humans in an unspecified cataclysm.

The land of Bugaria is separated into kingdoms, each ruled by a different species of colonial insects: Ants to the center, Bees to the West, Termites to the South, and Wasps to the North. The land also includes features such as a vast desert (contained in a sandbox) and a lake (a puddle formed from a leaky hose).

The land is also home to strange relics and ruins left behind by the first group of insects to gain sentience: Roaches. One such legendary relic is the Everlasting Sapling, said to grant bugs eternal life. The Sapling is hidden however, but it is known that a collection of artifacts can be used to find it. The search for the Sapling has led the Ant Kingdom to establish an Explorer's Association, to fund expeditions to find these artifacts.

Plot

In order to form an adventuring team, Kabbu partners up with Vi to register with the Explorer's Association. After passing their initial trial, they are deployed to Snakemouth Den, a dangerous cavern and suspected home of an artifact.

In the cave, the pair find the ruins of a roach city, guarded by a monstrous spider. They also find a moth trapped in its web. Together, the two free the moth and escape deeper into the ruin. The moth, Leif, reveals himself to be able to use magic, an extraordinarily rare feat; but also admits to memory loss: he is unable to recall what happened to him in the cave to give him this ability.

Eventually, the trio manage to find the artifact and defeat the spider, barely escaping as the cavern floods. They are dubbed "Team Snakemouth" in recognition of the accomplishment, and are rewarded by the queen of the Ant Kingdom, Elizant II. Before long, the team is sent out again to find the other artifacts in different regions of Bugaria.

As they explore, Leif reveals that he served Elizant II's mother and predecessor, Elizant I, and that he had apparently been in the cave for at least a whole generation. Vi reveals her estrangement to the Bee kingdom, who criticized her decision to become an explorer, but is later able to make peace with her sister. After exploring a ruined castle in the desert, Team Snakemouth is able to explore deeper into Snakemouth Den, where in an abandoned Roach laboratory, Leif discovers the truth about his amnesia, his magic, and his lapse in time: He is in fact a colony of sapient Cordyceps fungus created by the Roaches to channel magic, inhabiting the body of the deceased adventurer Leif, who was killed by the Spider but reanimated by the fungus.

After recovering the fourth and final artifact, the Ant Kingdom is attacked by soldiers of the Wasp Kingdom, led by the mysterious Wasp King. The Wasp King, able to wield fire magic, proves too much for the adventurers, and he absconds with the final artifact.

Team Snakemouth ventures into the northern grasslands to recover the artifact from the Wasp Kingdom, an isolated and militaristic people. They pass through a dangerous swamp, during which Kabbu reveals that a monstrous centipede living in the area killed his travelling companions during his journey to Bugaria from his home to the north. Upon encountering the beast again, Kabbu is able to slay it, finally avenging his comrades.

Infiltrating the Wasp Kingdom, Team Snakemouth discovers the imprisoned and deposed Wasp Queen, Vanessa II, who reveals that the Wasp King mysteriously took control of the wasps as if by magic and usurped her. They also realize the Wasp King is not here; this was a trap set to lure the Ant Kingdom's strongest out of the kingdom so the Wasp King could return and take the other artifacts with little resistance.

The team returns to the Ant Kingdom but is powerless to stop the Wasp King from carrying out his plan and escaping to the Sapling's resting place: the Giant's Lair, the abandoned human domicile looming over Bugaria. Elizant II, broken and humiliated, admits that her true plan with the Sapling was to use it to revive and rejuvenate her mother (who, thought dead, is actually being kept alive in stasis through Roach technology), and to abdicate the throne to her, understanding that her mother was a much more beloved queen and that her own lack of diplomatic tact has led to several broken ties with other kingdoms.

Out of options, Elizant II requests that Team Snakemouth escort her to the Termite Kingdom, a powerful and technologically advanced, but isolationist kingdom located in the foggy and barren Forsaken Lands that had become estranged from the Ant Kingdom following Elizant I's alleged passing. There, they meet with the Termite monarchy, and after Team Snakemouth proves the magnitude of the threat of the Wasps, the Termites agree to provide military support and transportation to the entrance to the Giant's Lair. Team Snakemouth, other adventuring teams, Ant Soldiers, and Elizant II convene at the entrance. Once there, Vanessa II gives Team Snakemouth a personal heirloom that protected her from the Wasp King's magic.

Within the abandoned monolith, the adventurers discover a village of living Roaches, who have sworn to protect the Sapling, but were unable to stop the Wasp King from passing through. When questioned, Elizant II reveals that her new plan is to destroy the Sapling, saying its influence consumed her mother, and (backed up by Leif) had ruined the lives of countless bugs, including the Roaches who doomed themselves to living in the dangerous and dreary Deadlands to protect it.

Moved by this, the Roaches allow them to proceed, and eventually they find the Wasp King just before he unlocks the Sapling. Using his fire magic, he incapacitates everyone except Team Snakemouth, who are protected by Vanessa's relic. Without his strongest weapon, the team defeats the King, but they are unable to stop him from unlocking the Sapling. However, the Sapling is withered, only growing a single shriveled seed. Despite this, the Wasp King consumes the seed, granting him incredible strength and vitality, and destroys the Sapling. Even with this, Team Snakemouth is able to defeat him, and, having exhausted all of his power, the Wasp King is transformed into a harmless, nonmagical tree.

Back in the Ant Kingdom, Team Snakemouth is rewarded with a grand celebration, and are officially knighted by Elizant II, who, thanks to reopening relations with the Wasps and Termites, is now seen as a much better queen. While talking with Leif, she admits that while not fully satisfied that she was unable to bring her mother back, she is glad that she was able to fulfill her greatest wish.

Development
Bug Fables was developed by independent Panamanian developer Moonsprout Games, made up of Jose Fernando Gracia and Marcio Cleiton. The game started development in 2015 and was tentatively titled Paper Bugs until its final name was revealed in January 2018, alongside an IndieGoGo campaign. A playable demo was also released. Bug Fables' gameplay and aesthetics were inspired by the first two Paper Mario games, as the developers felt the later games strayed too far from those games' formula. Other role-playing games which influenced Bug Fables include Persona 5, Tales of Zestiria, Golden Sun, and Xenoblade.

Reception

Bug Fables received generally favourable reviews, with most praise focusing on the game's level design and combat, positively comparing it to the early Paper Mario games as well as the writing being on par and one of the game's highlights. Another highlight of the game according to critics is the art style which was both "pleasant and simple". However, some critics felt that it did falter in its platforming sections. In addition, certain puzzles were cited as quite hard to accomplish due to the 'flat' artstyle, mostly with Vi's boomerang.

References

External links
Official development blog

2019 video games
Indie video games
Role-playing video games
Video games developed in Panama
Windows games
Nintendo Switch games
PlayStation 4 games
Xbox One games
Fictional bees
Video games about insects
Single-player video games